Frank Leslie (1821–1880) was an English-born American engraver, illustrator, and publisher.

Frank Leslie may also refer to:
Frank Matthews Leslie (1935–2000), professor and mathematical physicist
Buckskin Frank Leslie (1842–1930), U.S. Army scout, gambler, miner, and gunfighter
Frank Leslie (Medal of Honor) (1841–1882), Medal of Honor recipient
Miriam Leslie (1836–1914), wife of Frank Leslie who legally changed her name to Frank after his death

See also
Francis Leslie (disambiguation)